Chris Brown's Journey is a DVD containing videos for Brown's first single "Run It!" featuring Juelz Santana, "Yo (Excuse Me Miss)" and "Gimme That (Remix)" featuring Lil Wayne. A CD boasts an international version of "Run It!" and the track "So Glad", which had been previously unreleased in the United States.

Also included on the DVD are dance demos and a half-hour documentary featuring highlights from Brown's promo tours in the United Kingdom and Japan, Grammy Week in Los Angeles and rehearsals for his tour.

Certifications

References

2006 video albums
Chris Brown albums